Edward James Cowan FRSE (15 February 1944 – 2 January 2022) was a Scottish historian.

Biography
Cowan was born on 15 February 1944 in Edinburgh, Midlothian. He was a professor of Scottish History at the University of Glasgow and Director of the University's Dumfries Campus. He had previously taught at the University of Edinburgh and at the Guelph University, Ontario. A fellow of the Royal Society of Edinburgh, he was also a Visiting Professor in Australia, New Zealand, Canada and the United States.

He lived in the Glenkens area of Kirkcudbrightshire. Cowan died from lung cancer on 2 January 2022, at the age of 77.

Books 
Folk in Print: Scotland’s Chapbook Heritage, 1750-1850, with Mike Paterson (Edinburgh: John Donald, 2007) 438pp.
Ed. The Wallace Book (Edinburgh: John Donald, 2007) 240pp.
'For Freedom Alone': The Declaration of Arbroath 1320 (East Linton: Tuckwell Press, 2003) 162pp.
Scottish History: The Power of the Past, ed. with Richard Finlay (Edinburgh: Edinburgh University Press, 2002) 279pp.
Scottish Fairy Belief: A History, with Lizanne Henderson (East Linton: Tuckwell Press, 2001; Edinburgh: Birlinn, 2007) 242pp.
Alba: Celtic Scotland in the Medieval Era, ed. with R. A. McDonald (East Linton: Tuckwell Press, 2000; reprinted 2003) 282pp.
Ed. The Ballad in Scottish History (East Linton: Tuckwell Press, 2000) 184pp.
Scotland Since 1688: Struggle for a Nation, with Richard Finlay (London: CIMA, 2000) 192pp.
The Polar Twins: Scottish History and Scottish Literature, ed. with Douglas Gifford (Edinburgh: John Donald, 1999) 310pp.
Ed. The People's Past: Scottish Folk, Scottish History (Edinburgh: Polygon, 1980; reprinted 1995) 223pp.
Montrose For Covenant and King (London: Weidenfeld and Nicolson, 1977; reprinted Edinburgh: Canongate, 1995) 326pp. Winner of a Scottish Arts Council Award.

References

1944 births
2022 deaths 
Deaths from lung cancer
Academics of the University of Glasgow
Alumni of the University of Edinburgh
Fellows of the Royal Society of Edinburgh
Historians of Scotland
20th-century Scottish historians
Scottish literary critics
Academics from Edinburgh
21st-century Scottish historians